The Indonesia Technocrat University (Universitas Teknokrat Indonesia) is a private higher education in Bandar Lampung, Sumatra, Indonesia. Subjects taught include information management, computer science, and languages.

History 

Teknokrat Indonesian University is one of the private universities in Lampung, precisely located at Jalan Zainal Abidin Pagaralam No. 9-11 Labuhan Ratu, Bandarlampung. This university, which has the motto of discipline, quality, creativity, and innovation, was originally an educational institution called the Teknokrat Course and Guidance. This educational institution was founded by Dr. H.M. Nasrullah Yusuf, S.E., M.B.A. based on the permission of the Ministry of Education and Culture (Depdiknas) of Lampung Province on February 19, 1986.

At the beginning of its establishment, the Teknokrat Course and Guidance was limited to courses in English, Accounting, Tutoring, and manual typing. There were only two teaching staff at that time, namely Dr. H.M. Nasrullah Yusuf, S.E., M.B.A. and wife Hj. Hernaini, S.S., M.Pd.

 In 1995, the Teknokrat Course and Guidance changed its name to the Teknokrat Education Institute. This institution oversees two departments, namely the Department of Courses and Guidance, and the Department of Business and Management Education Institutions. Furthermore, the Institute for Business and Management Education seeks to continuously develop its educational programs. In 1996, the One-Year Teknokrat Education Program started its learning process and continues to this day.

Thanks to the rapid development and achievements that have been achieved by the Teknokrat Education Institute, this institution continues to strive to increase its participation in the intellectual life of the nation. Efforts were made to establish a Teknokrat College in 2000. The established universities include three institutions, namely the Teknokrat Higher School of Information Management and Computer (STMIK), Teknokrat Academy of Information Management and Computer (AMIK) and Teknokrat Higher School of Foreign Language (STBA).

Teknokrat Higher School of Information Management and Computer (STMIK) received its operational permission and legal status on February 8, 2001 and has registered itself to the Indonesian Directorate General of Higher Education with the letter No. 13/D/O/2001. Its study programs are S1 degrees of Information Technique (TI) and Information System (SI). Those programs have been accredited ‘B’ by the National Accreditation Board for Higher Education (BAN PT). 

AMIK Teknokrat received its operational permission and legal status on June 9, 2000 and has registered itself to the Indonesian Directorate General of Higher Education with the letter No. 92/D/O/2000. Its study programs are Computerized Accounting (TA), Information Management (MI), and Computer Technique (TK). These D3 programs have been accredited by the National Accreditation Board for Higher Education (BAN PT) since 2003. In 2014, the Computerized Accounting program study got ‘A’ for its accreditation. This is now the only Computerized Accounting program accredited ‘A’ in Indonesia.

STBA Teknokrat received its operational permission and legal status on April 25, 2000 and has registered itself to the Indonesian Directorate-General of Higher Education with the letter No. 48/D/O/2000. Its study programs are S1 English Literature, D3 English, and D3 Japanese. These three study programs have also been accredited by the National Accreditation Board for Higher Education (BAN PT) since 2003.

Academic Program 

The Teknokrat Campus is located at Zainal Abidin Pagaralam street No. 9-11 Labuhan Ratu, Bandarlampung. In 2015, the Teknokrat Education Foundation submitted a proposal to the Directorate General of Higher Education to merge the three organized institutions into a university. The efforts and hard work of the Teknokrat Education Foundation finally paid off with the approval of the merger of STMIK-AMIK-STBA Teknokrat into a university under the name of the Teknokrat Indonesia University with Decree No. 494/KPT/I/2017, which came into effect on January 19, 2017. The Teknokrat Indonesia University organizes 3 faculties, including the Faculty of Engineering and Computer Science, the Faculty of Economics and the Faculty of Arts and Education.

Faculty of Engineering and Computer Science (FTIK) Teknokrat 

The Faculty of Engineering and Computer Science has 7 study programs consisting of 6 undergraduate programs (strata 1) and 1 diploma program. Study programs at FTIK UTI include:

 S1 Informatics study program
 S1 Information Systems study program
 Information Technology S1 study program
 S1 Computer Engineering study program
 Electrical Engineering S1 study program
 S1 Civil Engineering Study Program
 D3 Accounting Information Systems study program

The Faculty of Engineering and Computer Science has a vision in 2025 to become a superior higher education institution in the field of applied science and computer science in Sumatra and play an active role in nation building through the process of education, research and community service.

Faculty of Economics (FEB) Teknokrat 

The Faculty of Economics and Business, Universitas Teknokrat Indonesia (FEB UTI), is one of the faculties within the Universitas Teknokrat Indonesia which was established on January 18, 2017 based on the Decree of the Minister of Research Technology and Higher Education No. 494/KPT/I/2017. Currently FEB UTI organizes 2 undergraduate study programs (S1), namely

 S1 Management Study Program
 S1 Accounting Study Program

The Faculty of Economics and Business has a vision to become a Center for Science and Technology Development in superior management, business, and accounting supported by information technology at the national level by 2025 and internationally by 2030.

Faculty of Arts and Education (FSIP) Teknokrat 

The Faculty of Arts and Education, Universitas Technokrat Indonesia offers four excellent programs, consisting of:

 S1 English Literature  
 S1 English Education 
 S1 Mathematics Education  
 S1 Sports Education 

The English Literature program develops student competencies in literature, linguistics, culture, English for specific purposes, and translation which prepares them to work in ministries and embassies as well as mingle with multinational companies and global industry. Meanwhile, the educational program equips students with pedagogic and professional skills, as well as competencies in the field of information and technology that will enable students to pursue professional teaching careers in both public and private schools, within and outside Indonesia. Students in all programs are also equipped with the entrepreneurial, creative and agile mindset needed in today's dynamic workplace.

Achievement 
Among the achievements made by Teknokrat in 2014 are general winner of Kontes Robot Indonesia (Indonesian robotic contest), national winner of Kontes Robot Terbang Indonesia (KRTI, Indonesian contest for flying robots), national winner of Kontes Kapal Cepat Tak Berawak (unmanned, fast robo-boat contest), and the 1st winner of Kontest Robot Seni Indonesia (Indonesian art-robot contest). In addition, Teknokrat is one of five Indonesian colleges awarded The National ICT's Smartest Campus Award in 2013.

Achievements by students of the Teknokrat language unit are becoming National Champion of News Casting ALSA ’19 in 2015 and becoming the champion of Japanese speech in Sumatra level in 2013, 2014 and 2015. Besides, students of Teknokrat foreign language school were the Asia runner up of spoken English in Asean English Olimpic in 2014.

Other achievements by Teknocrat students are representing Indonesia in World English language Debating Championship in De La Salle University (Philippines) and are succeeded become an ambassador of Youth Exchange Program in 2012, 2013 and 2015.

Student Activity Unit 
Student Activity Unit (UKM) is a student organization whose function is to accommodate a variety of interests and talents of the students in  Teknokrat. Those Student Activity Unit are:

Student Academic Units 

 UKM Robotics
 UKM TEC
 UKM Animation Design
 UKM Programming

Spirituality Units 

 UKM Islam
 UKM Catholic Lumen Cristi
 UKM Cristian Youth of Teknokrat
 UKM Hindu
 UKM Buddha

Student Art Units 

 UKM Dance
 UKM Choir
 UKM Band
 UKM Ambassador
 UKM T-Action

Sport Units 

 UKM Football
 UKM Futsal
 UKM Basketball
 UKM Volley
 UKM Karate
 UKM Pencak Silat
 UKM Badminton
 UKM Taekwondo
 UKM Student Regiment

Facilities

Computer Laboratory 

Teknokrat has eight computer laboratories, including internet laboratory, intranet and multimedia, hardware and networking laboratory, digital electronics laboratory, and software laboratory.

All computers in the laboratory are connected to the internet with high speed access. Besides, the entire area has been connected via a wireless internet network, Wi-Fi. The other technologies, multimedia computer with technology LAN, LED TV 60 and 70 inch, are equipped with a multimedia projector.

Language Laboratory 

There are two language laboratories. These laboratories are equipped with Multimedia computers and LED TV 60 and 70 inch. In addition, the language laboratory has been equipped with a set of electronic equipment, audio video consisting of instructor console as the main engine, equipped with a repeater language learning machine, tape recorder, DVD player, video monitors, headsets, and 40 students booth installed with a set of computer and screen in a single space. There are also components of a multimedia computer that can be used as additional components which are combined with all of them. If this is done then the language laboratory also serves as a multimedia language laboratory.

Office and Secretarial Laboratory 

In the Office and Secretarial laboratory, a variety of modern office equipment is available, such as:
 Room and table for the receptionist
 Director's room with a desk director
 Meeting room with modern table
 Small rooms in each section / unit
 Computer  connected to a Local Area Network including printer CCTV
 Manual typewriting
 Fax Machine
 Paper shredder
 Infocuswith screen
 File Cabinets, etc.

Library 

Teknokrat has a library which provides a complete collection consisting of books, thesis, scientific paper of lecturers, scientific journals, popular magazines, newspapers, dictionaries, encyclopedias, and handbooks. There is also a collection of thesis from the field of informatics and languages.

Auditorium 

There is an auditorium which is used for seminars, workshops, meetings, training, art activity, and others. The auditorium has a capacity of 700 people.

Indoor Stadium 

Teknokrat has an indoor stadium with 1500 capacity of people which functions as auditorium for sport activity (basketball, futsal, volleyball and badminton), educational activity (seminar, general stadium, training, English and art contest) and college activity (propti, yudisium, art event)

Classrooms 

Facilities in all classrooms in Teknokrat include full AC, personal computer, and 60-inch LED TV as projector. Activity at the classroom is controlled by Closed Circuit Television (CCTV) to control the teaching and learning process.

References

External links

Universities in Indonesia
Universities in Lampung
Bandar Lampung
Lampung